Amir Kia Sar (also Romanized as Amīr Kīā Sar, Amīr Keyāsar, Amīr Kīāsar, and Amīr Kīyasar) is a village in Kiashahr Rural District, Kiashahr District, Astaneh-ye Ashrafiyeh County, Gilan Province, Iran. At the 2006 census, its population was 1,135, in 336 families.

References 

Populated places in Astaneh-ye Ashrafiyeh County